The Kabetogama State Forest is a state forest located in Koochiching and Saint Louis counties, Minnesota, United States. The forest borders the Superior National Forest and the Boundary Waters Canoe Area Wilderness to the east, the Sturgeon River State Forest to the south, the Nett Lake Indian Reservation to the west, and Voyageurs National Park to the north. The forest is managed by the Minnesota Department of Natural Resources.

Recreation
Popular outdoor recreational activities are largely centered on the abundant lakes and rivers in the forest, such as boating, canoeing, kayaking, and fishing. "Boat-in camping" (canoe camping) is possible on the popular  Lake Vermilion, and more traditional camping is possible throughout the forest. Campsites administered by the forest are available on Namakan Lake and the  Kabetogama Lake, which are technically located within Voyageurs National Park.

Trails are designated for hiking and snowmobiling,  specifically for cross-country skiing and mountain biking,  for Class I and II all-terrain vehicle use, as well as dirt biking.

See also
List of Minnesota state forests
Boundary Waters Canoe Area Wilderness
Voyageurs National Park

External links
Kabetogama State Forest - Minnesota Department of Natural Resources (DNR)

References

Minnesota state forests
Protected areas of Koochiching County, Minnesota
Protected areas of St. Louis County, Minnesota
Protected areas established in 1933